Events from the year 1474 in Ireland.

Incumbent
Lord: Edward IV

Events
 Gilbert Debenham appointed Lord Chancellor of Ireland

Deaths

References